Tir Kaman (also Romanized as Tīr Kamān and Tīr-e Kamān) is a village in Bezenjan Rural District, in the Central District of Baft County, Kerman Province, Iran. At the 2006 census, its population was 53, in 16 families.

References 

Populated places in Baft County